Feuquières-Broquiers is a railway station located between Broquiers and Feuquières in the Oise department, France. It is situated on the Beauvais-Abancourt section of the Épinay-Villetaneuse–Le Tréport-Mers railway. It is an unattended station, served by TER Hauts-de-France trains between Beauvais and Tréport-Mers.

Near the station, towards Beauvais, there is a branch line to the Saverglass glass factory.

History 

During the First World War, a railway was built from Feuquières to Ponthoile on the Longueau–Boulogne railway, north of Noyelles-sur-Mer. It allowed for the military convoys to reach the Abbeville-Eu railway and the Longueau–Boulogne railway without passing into enemy fire.

The line, which was completed within a thousand days, played a major role in the final offensives of the Allies during the late summer and fall of 1918. Lacking commercial interest, the line was abandoned in 1920.

See also 
 List of SNCF stations in Hauts-de-France

References

Railway stations in Oise
Railway stations in France opened in 1875